Annalisa Drew (born May 28, 1993) is an American freestyle skier.

Drew competed with Team USA at the 2014 Winter Olympics in Sochi, Russia.

References

External links 
 
 
 
 
 

1993 births
Living people
American female freestyle skiers
Olympic freestyle skiers of the United States
Freestyle skiers at the 2014 Winter Olympics
Freestyle skiers at the 2018 Winter Olympics
People from Andover, Massachusetts
X Games athletes
Sportspeople from Essex County, Massachusetts
21st-century American women